
Gmina Biała Piska is an urban-rural gmina (administrative district) in Pisz County, Warmian-Masurian Voivodeship, in northern Poland.

Villages
Apart from the town of Biała Piska, Gmina Biała Piska contains the villages and settlements of Bełcząc, Bemowo Piskie, Cibory, Cwaliny, Dąbrówka Drygalska, Danowo, Długi Kąt, Dmusy, Drygały, Giętkie, Grodzisko, Gruzy, Guzki, Iłki, Jakuby, Kaliszki, Klarewo, Kolonia Kawałek, Kolonia Konopki, Komorowo, Konopki, Kowalewo, Kózki, Kożuchowski Młyn, Kożuchy, Kożuchy Małe, Kruszewo, Kumielsk, Lipińskie, Lisy, Łodygowo, Mikuty, Monety, Myśliki, Myszki, Nitki, Nowe Drygały, Oblewo, Orłowo, Pawłocin, Pogorzel Mała, Pogorzel Wielka, Radysy, Rakowo Małe, Rogale Wielkie, Rolki, Ruda, Skarżyn, Sokoły, Sokoły Jeziorne, Sulimy, Świdry, Świdry Kościelne, Szkody, Szkody-Kolonia, Szymki, Włosty, Wojny, Zabielne, Zalesie, Zaskwierki and Zatorze-Kolonia.

Neighbouring gminas
Gmina Biała Piska is bordered by the gminas of Ełk, Grabowo, Kolno, Orzysz, Pisz, Prostki and Szczuczyn.

References

Polish official population figures 2006

Biala Piska
Pisz County